Max Brennan may refer to:
Max Brennan (musician), British musician
Max Brennan (physicist), Australian scientist
Max Keenan, also known as Max Brennan, a character in the television series Bones